Marrgu (Marrku) is a recently extinct Aboriginal language of northern Australia. Additional names include Ajokoot, Croker Island, Raffles Bay, Terrutong (Terutong), Yaako (Jaako, Yako).

Classification
Marrgu had been assumed to be an Iwaidjan language like its neighbours. However, Evans (2006) has produced evidence that it was a language isolate, with possible connection to the extinct and poorly attested Wurrugu. This connection however is merely theoretical.

Phonology

Consonant inventory

Vowels
Marrgu had the three-vowel (/a/, /i/, /u/) system typical of Iwaidjan languages (Evans 1998).

References

Marrku–Wurrugu languages
Extinct languages of the Northern Territory